Cavan Huang is a creative director, designer, and design educator. He attended McGill University in Montreal where received his BA in history and urban planning. Huang then studied at Rhode Island School of Design in Providence, Rhode Island, where he received his MFA in graphic design in 2005. He creates digital ideas, products and experiences that make meaningful impact for brands and organizations. Much of his inspiration comes from the details of cities, lights, traffic, sounds, and people. Huangs work can be found in Contemporary Graphic Design, The New York Times, Ad Age, a PBS documentary, the Time Warner Center, AIGA, TED, Cannes Lions, the Webby Awards, and the White House.

Awards
2021
Webby Award Winner: Best Public Service Activism: 9/11 Day
Shorty Award Silver: Non-Profit Social Good: 9/11 Day
2020
Webby Award Honoree: Best Corporate Communications: Con Edison
2019
Webby Award Honoree: Best Visual Function App: Con Edison
2018
ADC One Club Merit Award: Branding Logo: Petfinder
Webby Award Winner: Best Community Website: Petfinder
Webby Award Honoree: Best User Interface Website: Con Edison
2016
Brand New: Most Notable Brands of 2016: Petfinder
2015
Webby Award Honoree: Best Political Website: ACLU The Uncovery
2014
Rebrand 100 Award: Cabot Brand
2012
Emmy Award: Best New Approach to News & Documentary: Time Beyond 9/11: Portraits of Resilience
2010
AIGA 365 Award: AIGA MAKE/THINK Conference Titles
2009 
Webby Award Honoree: Best Navigation: The Art of the Possible
2006
Nominated as 1 of 25 emerging designers, Step Inside Design magazine, New York
2004
Best Multimedia Design, Summit Creative Awards, Toronto
2003
Best Multimedia Design, Applied Arts magazine, Toronto

Professional experience
2021-present - group creative director, HUGE, New York
2015–2021 - creative director, POSSIBLE / Wunderman Thompson, New York
2011–2015 - associate creative director, Interbrand, New York
2009-2014 - adjunct professor / design critic, Rhode Island School of Design, Providence
2007–2011 - senior art director and interactive designer, Time Warner, New York
2005–2007 - digital media designer, Time Warner, New York
2003–2005 - instructor, Rhode Island School of Design, Providence
2001–2002 - multimedia designer, Colorshadow Communications, Toronto
2000–2001 - multimedia web designer, Rompus Interactive, Toronto

References

External links 
 

American graphic designers
Living people
Year of birth missing (living people)
Rhode Island School of Design alumni